Sauna Open Air Metal Festival, shortly Sauna Open Air or just Sauna, is one of the largest music festivals dedicated only to metal and related styles of music in the Nordic countries. It was first arranged in 2004 and takes place in the Ratinanniemi park in Tampere, Finland. From 8 June to 10 June 2006, over 20,000 people arrived to watch such bands as Cradle of Filth, Finntroll, Iggy & The Stooges, Lordi, Twisted Sister and W.A.S.P.

In 2007, the festival gathered an audience of over 22,000 people, at the time a record audience for the Sauna festival. This record was beaten in 2011, with a new record audience of 26,000.

In 2019, the festival made a comeback after a six-year hiatus and was held in Ratinanniemi Park.

Artists by year
Headliners are bolded.

2004
Children of Bodom,
Diablo,
Dreamtale,
Finntroll,
Helloween,
Lordi,
My Fate,
Nightwish,
Swallow the Sun,
Tarot,
Thunderstone,
Twilightning,
Underwear.

2005
Amoral,
Deathchain,
Dio,
Dreamtale,
Kiuas,
Kotipelto,
Machine Men,
Megadeth,
Mokoma,
Moonsorrow,
Norther,
Pain,
Roctum,
Sentenced,
Slayer,
Sonata Arctica,
Teräsbetoni.

2006
April,
The Black League,
Blake,
Charon,
Cradle of Filth,
Diablo,
Ensiferum,
Finntroll,
The Flaming Sideburns,
Iggy & The Stooges,
Kiuas,
Lordi,
Stam1na,
Turmion Kätilöt,
Twisted Sister,
Verjnuarmu,
W.A.S.P.

2007
Ari Koivunen,
Dark Tranquillity,
Dimmu Borgir,
Entwine,
Heaven and Hell,
Korpiklaani,
Kotipelto,
Kotiteollisuus,
Leverage,
Los Bastardos Finlandeses,
Megadeth,
Pain Confessor,
Poisonblack,
Sabaton,
Sonata Arctica,
Stam1na,
Swallow the Sun,
Thunderstone,
Timo Rautiainen,
Type O Negative,
Violent Storm (cancelled).

2008
Airbourne,
Amorphis,
Sebastian Bach,
Graham Bonnet & Joe Lynn Turner,
Children of Bodom,
Diablo,
Eläkeläiset,
Iiwanajulma,
Kiuas,
KYPCK,
Masterstroke,
Mokoma,
MoonMadness,
Rytmihäiriö,
Scorpions,
Sonata Arctica,
Stam1na,
Stone,
Testament,
Tracedawn,
When the Empire Falls,
Whitesnake,
Widescreen Mode.

2009
45 Degree Woman,
Amorphis,
Apocalyptica,
Bullet,
Deuteronomium,
Duff McKagan's Loaded,
Finntroll,
Hardcore Superstar (cancelled),
HammerFall,
Kamelot,
Kotiteollisuus,
Medeia,
Meshuggah (cancelled),
Mötley Crüe,
Nightwish,
Omnium Gatherum,
Poisonblack,
Prestige,
Profane Omen,
Soilwork,
Sparzanza,
Stratovarius,
Sturm und Drang,
Thor,
Viikate.

2010
Amorphis,
Anvil,
Audrey Horne,
August Burns Red, 
Danzig,
Death Angel,
Doom Unit,
Glamour of the Kill,
Grave Digger,
Hail!,
Insomnium,
Kiss,
Peer Günt,
Poisonblack,
Ratt (cancelled),
Tarot,
The 69 Eyes, 
Sonata Arctica,
Stam1na,
Steel Panther,
Suburban Tribe,
Whitechapel.

2011
Judas Priest,
Ozzy Osbourne,
Helloween,
Omnium Gatherum,
Saxon,
Doro,
Cavalera Conspiracy,
Rytmihäiriö,
Mokoma,
Tarot,
Blake,
Anthriel,
Moonsorrow,
Turisas,
Viikate,
Joey Belladonna,
Dio Disciples,
Queensrÿche,
Accept,
Battle Beast,
Sparzanza

2013
Nightwish,
Opeth,
Children of Bodom,
Bloodred Hourglass,
Finntroll,
Lost Society,
Volbeat,
Hardcore Superstar,
Sabaton,
Hatebreed,
Crashdïet,
Stam1na,
Omnium Gatherum,
Egokills,
Ghost Voyage

2019
W.A.S.P.,
Amorphis,
D-A-D,
Santa Cruz,
Marko Hietala,
Mokoma,
Flat Earth,
Whitesnake,
Europe,
Sonata Arctica,
Battle Beast,
Skindred,
Brother Firetribe,
One Desire

See also
 Tuska Open Air Metal Festival

References

External links

 Official website

Music festivals in Finland
Heavy metal festivals in Finland
Recurring events established in 2004
Tampere
Tourist attractions in Tampere
Summer events in Finland